The Caborca Cartel is a Mexican criminal organization commanded by the veteran drug lord Rafael Caro Quintero, (founder of the defunct Guadalajara Cartel) and concentrating its drug trafficking operations in the border municipality of Caborca. At present, the group has a bloody dispute with the Los Salazar criminal cell, identified as the armed wing of the Sinaloa Cartel. The group allied with the Juárez Cartel to dispute the areas of Sonora and Chihuahua, having regrouped their forces and deciding to dispute the territory of his former partner Joaquín "El Chapo" Guzmán.

History
According to the Secretariat of the Navy, it warned of the growing conflict between criminal cells Los Páez and/or Los Paleteros (led by Rodrigo Páez Quintero, nephew of Rafael Caro Quintero) and Los Cazadores together with Los Salazar, (cells related to the Sinaloa Cartel), causing an increase in intentional homicides in the state of Sonora. Since the beginning of 2020, various drug messages awarded to the Caborca Cartel commonly left after armed confrontations, stating that Caro Quintero comes through the territories that "belong to him." It was until January 2021 when federal intelligence sources confirmed that Caro Quintero runs the cartel. They also mention that the main objective of Caro Quintero has been to dispute the territory of Sonora with the faction of Los Chapitos and Los Salazar, led by the sons of Guzmán.

On 15 July 2022, Caro Quintero was captured by Mexican authorities in San Simón, a settlement within the Choix Municipality of Sinaloa.

References

Organizations established in 2019
2019 establishments in Mexico
Drug cartels in Mexico
Mexican drug war